Miss World 1998, the 48th edition of the Miss World pageant, was held on 26 November 1998 at the Lake Berjaya Mahé Resort in Mahé Island, Seychelles. 86 delegates from around the world competed for the crown. Ronan Keating, then lead singer of Boyzone, and MTV's Eden Harel hosted the event. This year's winner, Israel's Linor Abargil, revealed days after the competition that she had been raped several weeks before the pageant. She was crowned by Miss World 1997, Diana Hayden of India.

Results

Placements

Continental Queens of Beauty

Contestants

  – Wendy Sanchez
  – Maria Manuela Cortez de Lemos João
  – Natalia Elisa González
  – Judelca Shahira Briceno
  – Sarah-Jane Camille St. Clair
  – Sabine Lindorfer
  – LeTeasha Henrietta Ingraham
  – Tanja Dexters
  – Bianca Bauer Áñez
  – Samra Tojaga
  – Earthen Pinkinyana Mbulawa
  – Adriana Reis
  – Virginia Olen Rubiane
  – Polina Petkova
  – Leanne Baird
  – Gemma Marie McLaughlin
  – Daniella Andrea Campos Lathrop
  – Mónica Marcela Cuartas Jiménez
  – María Luisa Ureña Salazar
  – Lejla Šehović
  – Jeameane Veronica Colastica
  – Chrysanthi Michael
  – Alena Šeredová
  – Sharmin Arelis Díaz Costo
  – Vanessa Natania Graf Alvear
  – Ly Jürgenson
  – Maaret Saija Nousiainen
  – Véronique Caloc
  – Sandra Ahrabian
  – Efia Owusuaa Marfo
  – Melanie Soiza
  – Katia Marie Margaritoglou
  – Glenda Iracema Cifuentes Ruiz
  – Nerena Ruinemans
  – Jessie Chiu Chui-Yi
  – Eva Horvath
  – Annie Thomas
  – Vivienne Doyle
  – Linor Abargil 
  – Maria Concetta Travaglini
  – Christine Renee Straw
  – Rie Mochizuki
  – Anna Kirpota
  – Kim Kun-woo
  – Clemence Achkar
  – Olivia Precious Cooper
  – Kristina Pakarnaite
  – Lina Teoh Pick Lim
  – Rebecca Camilleri
  – Oona Sujaya Fulena
  – Vilma Verónica Zamora Suñol
  – Jyoti Pradhan
  – Tanya Hayward
  – Claudia Patricia Alaniz Hernández
  – Temitayo Osobu
  – Henriette Dankersten
  – Lorena del Carmen Zagía Miro
  – Perla Carolina Benítez Gonzales
  – Mariana Larrabure de Orbegoso
  – Rachel Muyot Soriano
  – Izabela Opęchowska
  – Marcia Vasconcelos
  – Antonia Alfonso Pagán
  – Tatiana Makrouchina
  – Myrtille Charlotte Brookson
  – Alvina Antoinette Grand d'Court
  – Grace Chay
  – Karolina Cicatkova
  – Mihaela Novak
  – Kerishnie Naicker
  – Rocío Jiménez Fernández
  – Cindy Stanckoczi
  – Jessica Magdalena Therése Almenäs
  – Sonja Grandjean
  – Chen Yi-Ju
  – Basila Kalubha Mwanukuzi
  – Jeanette Marie La Caillie
  – Buket Saygi
  – Nataliya Nadtochey
  – Emmalene McLoughlin
  – Shauna Gene Gambill
  – María Desiree Fernández Mautone
  – Verónica Schneider Rodríguez
  – Jelena Jakovljević
  – Chisala Chibesa
  – Annette Kambarami

Judges

 Eric Morley †
 Diana Hayden – Miss World 1997 from India
 Sophie Dahl
 Pilin Leon – Miss World 1981 from Venezuela 
 Jonah Lomu †  
 Mark Newson
 Terry O'Neill †
 Mica Paris
 Jacques Villeneuve

Scrutineer 

 David Boyd

Notes
 Miss Malaysia, Lina Teoh is the cousin of the owner for Lake Berjaya Resort, Mahé.

Debuts

Returns

Last competed in 1977:
 
Last competed in 1988:
 
Last competed in 1994:
 
Last competed in 1996:

Replacements
  - Nadia Rodgers-Albury was originally supposed to compete at Miss World but ended not competing after the Miss Bahamas Committee lost the franchise to a new organization and that organization decided to hold a new contest which crowned another queen that took her place.
  – Kateřina Stočesová - She won the Queen of the World 1998 title and was unable to compete due to contract duties. 
  – Dana Tolesh
  - Véronique Caloc was the first runner-up at Miss France 1998, representing Martinique. She was chosen to represent France at Miss World, while the winner of Miss France 1998, Sophie Thalmann, participated at Miss Universe 1998.

Withdrawals
  - Viola Jeffery - Due to lack of sponsors. She went to Miss Universe 1999.
  - Julina Felida - Due to lack of sponsors. She went to Miss Universe 1999.
  - The 3rd runner-up of the Miss Honduras 1997 pageant, Miriam Eloisa Vivas Luna was chosen to participate at Miss World 1998, but she wasn't able to travel to the contest due to the consequences of Hurricane Mitch in November of that year in Central America. She went to Miss Asia-Pacific 1998. 
  - Evija Rucevska - She withdrew for personal reasons, but competed a year later in Miss World 1999.
  Macau  - Miss Macau pageant stop to held due lack of sponsorship and low televiewers. Only was held in 2008 for 2 years.  
  - Miss Namibia 1998, Retha Reinders did not participate due to the lack of sponsorship.
  - Ban Kadret - She withdrew because of a disagreement between Eric Morley and the Miss Iraq organizers, due to sanctions placed on Iraq.
  - Miss Suriname 1998, Farah Breeveld did not participate due to the lack of sponsorship.
  - Lacked sponsorship to send a delegate.

References

External links
 Pageantopolis – Miss World 1998

Miss World
1998 beauty pageants
1998 in Seychelles
Beauty pageants in Seychelles
November 1998 events in Africa